Houlong Township is an urban township in western Miaoli County, Taiwan. It is bordered by the Taiwan Strait on the west and Zaoqiao Township on the east. It lies at the mouth of the Houlong River. Miaoli HSR station is located in Houlong.

Name
The township's name originates from that of a Taiwanese Plains Aborigines settlement. During the Kingdom of Tungning, the area was called Aulangsia. Other variants of Aulang existed (e.g.). In 1920, during Japanese rule, the place was renamed , under , Shinchiku Prefecture.  This name closely matched the Japanese pronunciation of the previous names but with different kanji (Chinese characters).  This written form was retained after the Kuomintang takeover of Taiwan in 1945; the characters are pronounced Hòulóng in Mandarin Chinese.  The Taiwanese Hokkien pronunciation remains Āu-lâng, based on the pre-1920 name.

Geography

 Area: 
 Population: 34,355 (January 2023 estimate)
It lies at the mouth of the Houlong River.

Administrative divisions
The township comprises 23 villages: Beilong, Dashan, Dazhuang, Dongming, Fengfu, Funing, Fuxing, Haibao, Haipu, Jiaoyi, Longjin, Longkeng, Nangang, Nanlong, Puding, Shuiwei, Waipu, Wanbao, Xinmin, Xiushui, Xizhou, Zhonghe and Zhonglong.

Politics
The township is part of Miaoli County Constituency I electoral district for Legislative Yuan.

Education
 Jen-Teh Junior College of Medicine, Nursing and Management

Tourist attractions

 Ciyun Temple
 Chinghai Temple
 Guogang Shell Fossils
 Hakka Round House
 Haowangjiao
 Houlong Art House
 Maling Temple
 Waipu Fishing Port
 Xihu Wetland
 Yingtsai Academy

Transportation

Houlong Township is accessible from Dashan Station, Houlong Station, Longgang Station and Fengfu Station of the Taiwan Railways. Taiwan High Speed Rail has one station in the township, which is Miaoli Station.

Notable natives
 Liu Cheng-hung, Magistrate of Miaoli County (2005-2014)

References

External links

 

Townships in Miaoli County
Taiwan placenames originating from Formosan languages